Juozas Tunaitis (October 25, 1928,  – June 1, 2012, Vilnius), was the Roman Catholic titular bishop of  (Sousse, Tunisia, 1991–2012) and the auxiliary bishop of the Roman Catholic Archdiocese of Vilnius, Lithuania (1991–2010).

Ordained to the priesthood in 1954, Tunaitis was named bishop in 1991 and retired in 2010.

References

External links 
 Mirė vyskupas J.Tunaitis // delfi.lt, Šaltinis
 Bishop Juozas Tunaitis dies at 84 // 15min.lt

20th-century Roman Catholic bishops in Lithuania
1928 births
2012 deaths
People from Panevėžys County
21st-century Roman Catholic bishops in Lithuania